Cieloszka  is a village in the administrative district of Gmina Turośl, within Kolno County, Podlaskie Voivodeship, in north-eastern Poland.

In 2008 the village had a population of 418.

References

Cieloszka